The following are the Pulitzer Prizes for 1921.

Journalism awards
Public Service:
The Boston Post, for its exposure of the operations of Charles Ponzi by a series of articles which finally led to his arrest.
Reporting:
Louis Seibold of New York World, for an interview with Woodrow Wilson.

Letters and Drama Awards
Novel:
The Age of Innocence by Edith Wharton (Appleton)
Drama:
Miss Lulu Bett by Zona Gale (Appleton)
History:
The Victory at Sea by William Sowden Sims in collaboration with Burton J. Hendrick (Doubleday)
Biography or Autobiography:
The Americanization of Edward Bok by Edward Bok (Scriber)

References

External links
Pulitzer Prizes for 1921

Pulitzer Prizes by year
Pulitzer Prize
Pulitzer Prize